Emilio Cardi Cigoli (18 November 1909 – 7 November 1980) was an Italian actor and voice actor.

Biography
Cigoli was born in Livorno to actress Giovanna Cigoli. His grandfather worked as a silent film actor. He began his career on stage at the age of 18 under the guidance of Alfredo De Sanctis and later did work for the EIAR. Cigoli appeared in more than 40 films and 20 television shows between 1935 and 1980, mostly in supporting roles. One of his major appearances was in the 1943 film The Children Are Watching Us as well as the 1950 film Sunday in August. Between 1943 and 1945, he worked in Spain with several colleagues to star in two Spanish-Italian films.

Cigoli found great success as a voice dubber, eventually doing voice work for over seven thousand films. He was the Italian voice of nearly every major Hollywood star from the 1940s through the 1960s, including Gregory Peck, John Wayne, Gary Cooper, Clark Gable, Henry Fonda, William Holden, Charlton Heston, Burt Lancaster, Steve Reeves, Vincent Price, Lee Van Cleef and Orson Welles. He also dubbed some Italian actors such as Andrea Checchi, Mino Doro, Alberto Farnese, Massimo Serato and Vittorio Gassman. Cigoli has dubbed the voice of the narrator in several documentaries, films and animated productions such as Sleeping Beauty, The Sword in the Stone and The Three Caballeros.

Cigoli married twice and had two children from his first marriage. He died in Rome on 7 November 1980 just 11 days before his 71st birthday.

Partial filmography

 I Love You Only (1936)
 Departure (1938) - L'impiegato dell'agenzia marittima
 La sposa dei re (1938) - Giuseppe Bonaparte
 L'eredità in Corsa (1939)
 Dora Nelson (1939) - Il finto tresoriere
 One Hundred Thousand Dollars (1940) - Oldham
 Beyond Love (1940) - Ippoliti
 L'imprevisto (1940) - Il giovane
 The Hero of Venice (1941) - Alvise Guoro
 Giarabub (1942) - Il maggiore John Williams
 Love Story (1942) - L'avvocato difensore
 We the Living (1942) - Pavel Sjerov
 The Gorgon (1942) - Miniato - lo scudiero
 La carica degli eroi (1943)
 Il matrimonio segreto (1943)
 Dora la espía (1943)
 The Children Are Watching Us (1943) - Andrea - il padre
 Fuga nella tempesta (1945) - Scienziato
 Shoeshine (1946) - Staffera
 The Lovers (1946)
 The Opium Den (1947) - De Rossi
 L'altra (1947) - Commissario
 The Charterhouse of Parma (1948) - (uncredited)
 Sunday in August (1950) - Alberto Mantovani
 Rapture (1950)
 Little World of Don Camillo (1952) - Narrator (voice, uncredited)
 Article 519, Penal Code (1952) - Padre di Clara
 The Return of Don Camillo (1953) - Narrator (voice, uncredited)
 Verdi, the King of Melody (1953) - Gaetano Donizetti
 Of Life and Love (1954) - Narrator in the prologue (uncredited)
 Pietà per chi cade (1954) - Attorney Marsi
 Guai ai vinti (1954) - Pietro, marito di Teresa
 Human Torpedoes (1954) - Ammiraglio
 The White Angel (1955) - Il direttore della prigione
 Don Camillo's Last Round (1955) - Voce narrante (uncredited)
 Giuramento d'amore (1955) - L'editore Edoardo Rufino
 I giorni più belli (1956) - Uno degli ex alunni
 Noi siamo le colonne (1956) - Narrator (voice, uncredited)
 The Most Wonderful Moment (1957) - Morelli
 Melancholic Autumn (1958) - Medico in contatto radio (uncredited)
 Lettere di una novizia (1960) - Publico Ministero
 Erik the Conqueror (1961) - Narrator (voice, uncredited)
 Il solco di pesca (1975) - Uncle of Davide

References

External links

 
 

1909 births
1980 deaths
People from Livorno
Italian male film actors
Italian male voice actors
Italian male stage actors
Italian male television actors
Italian voice directors
20th-century Italian male actors